Socialist Left Party may refer to:

Socialist Left Party (Austria)
Socialist Left Party (Norway)

See also
Socialist Party (disambiguation)
Left Socialist Party (disambiguation)